Komelia Hongja Okim (born 1939) is a sculptor born in Seoul, Korea. She is also known as Komelia Okim, Kim Hongja, and Hongja Kim
Okim received a BA from Indiana University Bloomington in 1969 and an MFA from the same institution in 1973.  She later traveled to Korea to learn traditional metalworking techniques.<ref>Honolulu Museum of Art, wall label, Ocean Melody III, accession 12745.1ab</ref>  She taught at Montgomery College in Rockville, MD from 1972 to 2014, and retired as a professor emerita.

Public collections holding work by Komelia Hongja Okim include Blue House (official residence of the president of the Republic of Korea), the Honolulu Museum of Art, the National Museum of Modern and Contemporary Art (Kwachon, Kyungki Do, Korea), the Museum of Arts and Design (New York City), the Renwick Gallery (Washington DC), and the Victoria and Albert Museum.

 References 

Further reading
 Anna Leonowens Gallery, Komelia Hongja Okim Hidden Energy Unified: East/West Metal Art, Anna Leonowens Gallery, 2002 ASIN: B000J40FCU
 Brown, James L. and Keun Joon Yoo Brown, Komelia Hongja Okim: Metal Arts, Gallery Hyundai, 1994 ASIN: B00JW5AIXI
 Gallery H, Komelia Hongja Okim: Mirrorscape, Gallery H, 2007 ASIN: B07BCMBY4S
 Honolulu Academy of Arts, Reflections of Two Worlds: A Korean American Heritage / Metalwork by Komelia Hongja Okim', Honolulu Academy of Arts, 2003 ASIN: B000R9J4EM
 Seoul Graphics, Komelia Hongja Okim Metal Work Exhibition'', Seoul Graphics, 1987 ASIN: B009DMGC7Q

1939 births
American women sculptors
American artists of Korean descent
American people of Korean descent
Artists from Seoul
Living people
20th-century American sculptors
20th-century American women artists
21st-century American sculptors
21st-century American women artists
Indiana University Bloomington alumni
Montgomery College faculty
Korean emigrants to the United States
American women academics